The bombardment of Beirut (1840) was a battle during the Egyptian–Ottoman War (1839–1841). It ended in an Allied victory and the city was captured.

Battle 
Egyptian troops marched along the coast to prevent the Anglo-Ottomans to take Beirut. However, the city was constantly shelled and the landing force was rapidly carried to D'jounie Bay. Charles Napier's army of British, Austrian, Ottoman and rebel troops entrenched themselves. After heavy shelling the city finally fell on the Allied's hands.

References 

Sidon
Sidon
Sidon
Sidon
Conflicts in 1840
1840 in Egypt
September 1840 events